The following events occurred in May 1955:

May 1, 1955 (Sunday)
The First Taiwan Strait Crisis comes to an end, as the People's Liberation Army of China temporarily ceases shelling Kinmen and Matsu.
The 1955 Grand Prix motorcycle racing season opens with the Spanish motorcycle Grand Prix, with Luigi Taveri winning the 125cc event and Reg Armstrong winning the 500cc.

May 2, 1955 (Monday)
In the UK, the Delph Donkey passenger train service is withdrawn from stations between Oldham and Delph.
Born: Ed Murray, American politician and 53rd mayor of Seattle

May 3, 1955 (Tuesday)
Born: David Hookes, Australian cricketer, in Mile End, Adelaide (died 2004)

May 4, 1955 (Wednesday)
Born: Ammar Belhimer, Algerian law educator and journalist; in El Aouana, Jijel Province, Algeria
Died: George Enescu, 73, Romanian composer

May 5, 1955 (Thursday)
West Germany becomes a sovereign country recognized by important Western foreign countries, such as France, the United Kingdom, Canada, and the United States.

May 6, 1955 (Friday)
The Western European Union charter comes into effect.
The Burmese ship SS Pyidawtha runs aground and is wrecked in the Bay of Bengal, off Cheduba Island.

May 7, 1955 (Saturday)
Born: Mayra Alejandra, Venezuelan actress, in Caracas (died 2014)

May 8, 1955 (Sunday)
Born: Meles Zenawi, Prime Minister of Ethiopia, in Adwa (died 2012)

May 9, 1955 (Monday)
West Germany joins the North Atlantic Treaty Organization (NATO).
Jim Henson introduces the earliest version of Kermit the Frog in the premiere of his puppet show Sam and Friends on WRC-TV in Washington, D.C.

May 10, 1955 (Tuesday)
United States Air Force 8th Tactical Fighter Wing pilot James E. McInerny. Jr. shoots down a MiG-15 (NATO reporting name "Fagot") fighter flown by a People's Republic of China pilot over Korea. It is the last MiG-15 shot down by United Nations forces in Korea.
Died:
Tommy Burns, 73, Canadian boxer
John Radecki, 89, Polish-born Australian stained-glass artist

May 11, 1955 (Wednesday)
Japanese National Railways' ferry Shiun Maru sinks after a collision with sister ship Uko Maru in thick fog off Takamatsu, Shikoku, in the Seto Inland Sea of Japan; 166 passengers (many children) and two crew are killed. This event is influential in plans to construct the Akashi Kaikyō Bridge (built 1986–98).
A shack in a Polish village of Wielopole Skrzyńskie, Subcarpathian Voivodeship     housing a movie projection 
Died: Gilbert Jessop, 80, English cricketer.
Famous Scientist Disappears Carl Vernon Holmberg, Professor Carl Vernon Holmberg, a famous cellulose chemist mysteriously disappeared. Many critics are skeptical. Including his three sons. Stating that there were no symptoms, but More importantly, right before he vanished, he spoke to his wife about a breakthrough at work. Holmberg took much pride in his work. He never spoke to even his wife about exactly what he was working on, in the laboratory. Prof. Holmberg was famous for a good reason. He was one of the best chemists in the world. I can only guess what he was discovered in his lab before he vanished. Professor Holmberg Apparently, was found years later, his mind a blank. No memories of his previous life. Vernon Hasen was the name he made up for himself, he didn't know who he was. Only found due to A traffic stop that occurred years later. Hasen Yielded to authorities and reported he didn't have an I.D. That led to fingerprinting by the local police, in Rockford, Illinois. The FBI stepped in figuring out years later, and A long way away from New York, that he was the famous scientist, that went missing many years previously. He stated he could remember nothing sometimes he felt like he recognized landscapes or had been there before, Holmberg-Hanson remained in Illinois. He lived out the remainder of his life, finding a new wife. His memory was fine after the disappearance it's like he was reborn or brain wiped clean states an anonymous blood relative of Holmberg-Hanson he just couldn't recall the first 50 years of his life before his disappearance. Holmberg-Hasen's Ex-Wife remarried and Sons grew old, a family he wishes he knew, his mind a blank. We will never know what happened in those long three months or what really happened but it is apparent that some things are better left unknown for Verne Hansen or Professor Carl Vernon Holmberg he wasn't so lucky. the FBI claims it to be amnesia. Source Among the missing By Dan Chaon, other facts from an interview with one of his relatives(anonymous)

May 12, 1955 (Thursday)
New York's Third Avenue Elevated runs its last train between Chathem Square in Manhattan and East 149th Street in the Bronx, thus ending elevated train service in Manhattan.
Local elections are held in the UK cities of Leeds and Liverpool.

May 13, 1955 (Friday)
A riot takes place at an Elvis Presley concert in Jacksonville, Florida, USA.

May 14, 1955 (Saturday)
Eight Communist Bloc countries, including the Soviet Union, sign a mutual defence treaty in Warsaw, Poland, that is called the Warsaw Pact. It will be dissolved in 1991.Born: Jonathan Robert De Mallie, Historian, Philanthropist, Investment Banker;Died:Charles Pelot Summerall, 88, US general;
Anwar Wagdi, 50, Egyptian actor and filmmaker (polycystic kidney disease)

May 15, 1955 (Sunday)
The Austrian State Treaty, which restores Austria's national sovereignty, is concluded between the four occupying powers following World War II (the United Kingdom, the United States, the Soviet Union, and France) and Austria, setting it up as a neutral country.
Lufthansa begins its international service, with flights between West Germany and London, Paris, and Madrid.
Lionel Terray and Jean Couzy become the first people to summit Makalu, the fifth-highest mountain in the world, on the 1955 French Makalu expedition. The entire team of climbers reach the summit over the next two days.

May 16, 1955 (Monday)Died: James Agee, 45, US writer (heart attack)

May 17, 1955 (Tuesday)
The Clark Art Institute opens to the public in Williamstown, Massachusetts, USA.

May 18, 1955 (Wednesday)
Dutch coaster Urmajo runs aground on the Goodwin Sands, Kent, United Kingdom. All ten crew are rescued by the Ramsgate lifeboat. They would later be returned to the ship which refloated on the next tide. Urmajo was towed into Ramsgate by the tug .
Free movement of residents between North and South Vietnam ended.Died: Mary McLeod Bethune, 79, US educator

May 19, 1955 (Thursday)
The Black Sash women's movement is founded in South Africa by Jean Sinclair, Ruth Foley, Elizabeth McLaren, Tertia Pybus, Jean Bosazza, and Helen Newton-Thompson.

May 20, 1955 (Friday)Born: Zbigniew Preisner, Polish film score composer, in Bielsko-Biała

May 21, 1955 (Saturday)
The final of the DFB-Pokal football tournament is held between Karlsruher SC and Schalke 04, with Karlsruher SC winning 3–2.
Chuck Berry records his first ever song, Maybellene.
Herman Schultheis, Disney animator and amateur photographer, disappears near Petén while on a trip to the Mayan temples at Tikal in Guatemala. His body will be found 18 months later.

May 22, 1955 (Sunday)Born: Chalmers "Spanky" Alford, US jazz guitarist, in Philadelphia, Pennsylvania. (died 2008)

May 23, 1955 (Monday)
Future Archbishop James Scanlan becomes Roman Catholic Bishop of Motherwell, Scotland.

May 24, 1955 (Tuesday)
The French Open tennis tournament opens at Stade Roland-Garros in Paris.

May 25, 1955 (Wednesday)
Joe Brown and George Band are the first to attain the summit of Kangchenjunga in the Himalayas, as part of the British Kangchenjunga expedition led by Charles Evans.
 A devastating tornado outbreak hits the Midwestern United States, producing the deadliest tornado in Kansas history, an F5 that struck Udall, Kansas. It also produces another F5 tornado that hits Blackwell, Oklahoma.

May 26, 1955 (Thursday)
1955 United Kingdom general electionDied: Alberto Ascari, 36, Italian race-car driver (racing accident)

May 27, 1955 (Friday)
The official Flag of Minneapolis is adopted.

May 28, 1955 (Saturday)
A state election is held in Victoria, Australia. John Cain's Labor government is defeated by the Liberal and Country Party, led by Henry Bolte.
The Associated Society of Locomotive Engineers and Firemen in the UK calls a strike which continues until June 14, leading to a State of emergency being declared on May 31.

May 29, 1955 (Sunday)
The Norfolk and Western Railway in the United States begins its conversion to diesel locomotive power from a purely steam locomotive roster with the purchase of eight ALCO RS-3s.Born: Mike Porcaro, US bass guitarist, in South Windsor, Connecticut (died 2015)

May 30, 1955 (Monday)
The UK minesweeper HMS Northumbria of the Royal Naval Volunteer Reserve is in a collision with the Cypriot ship MV Cyprian Prince off Newcastle upon Tyne and is holed. Cyprian Prince tows her into Newcastle upon Tyne.
The UK collier ship Harfry collides with another British ship, MV Firmity, off Great Yarmouth, Norfolk. Both ships are holed. Harfry is beached at Hemsby and Firmity puts into Great Yarmouth.Died:' Bill Vukovich, 36, US race-car driver, killed in a chain-reaction crash while holding a 17-second lead on the 57th lap of the 1955 Indianapolis 500.

May 31, 1955 (Tuesday)
As tensions in the Formosa Strait ease, the People's Republic of China releases four captured American fliers. It will release all other captured Americans over the summer.

References

1955
1955-05
1955-05